Lomsko shose Metro Station is a station on the Sofia Metro in Sofia, Bulgaria. It opened on 31 August 2012. Bulgaria's PM Boyko Borisov and the President of the European Commission Jose Manuel Barroso inaugurated the new section of the Sofia Metro, which was largely funded with EU money.

Interchange with other public transport
 City Bus service: 87

Gallery

References

External links

 Sofia Metropolitan
 More info in Bulgarian
 vijsofia.eu

Sofia Metro stations
Railway stations opened in 2012
2012 establishments in Bulgaria